Leeton is a town located in the Riverina region of New South Wales, Australia. Leeton is situated in the Murrumbidgee Irrigation Area, approximately 550 km west of Sydney and 450 km north of Melbourne. It is the administrative centre of the Leeton Shire Council local government area, which includes neighbouring suburbs, towns and localities such as Yanco, Wamoon, Whitton, Gogeldrie, Stanbridge and Murrami. Situated in one of the most productive farming regions in the state, the town was designed by Walter Burley Griffin and purpose-built for the irrigation schemes announced by the New South Wales government in the early 20th century. The Leeton Shire possesses numerous citrus, rice, cotton, grape, walnut and wheat farms. Leeton is known as Australia's Rice Capital, as well as The Heart of SunRice Country, as it is home to the headquarters of SunRice corporation, one of Australia's largest food exporters. Other industry includes Arnott’s Biscuits (previously Freedom Foods), the Daily Drinks Company, JBS Australia, Webster Limited, and Murrumbidgee Irrigation Limited. Tony Reneker is the current mayor of Leeton.

History

Prior to European colonisation, the area was inhabited by the Wiradjuri people. The town is named after Charles Alfred Lee, a Minister for Public Works in New South Wales from 1904 to 1910.

In 1912 a water tower was built to supply water to the town. Leeton Post Office opened on 6 September 1912.

In 1913 when the Water Conservation and Irrigation Commission of New South Wales was formed, Leeton was a canvas town, with the only houses being on farms built by settlers or the Commission-built homes for officers. The first block of land wasn't sold in the town until 3 April 1913. During 1913, a Kurrajong tree (later known as Pioneers' Tree), was planted as a central feature on the eponymous Kurrajong Avenue, and a butter factory was established in the town. In August of the same year, Walter Burley Griffin visited the town to complete its design.

In 1914 World War I broke out; of the town's population of 2,000 people, 200 men were serving in the military. During 1914 and 1915 an abattoir and canning factory were established in the town.

In 1919 the Hydro Hotel was constructed for Water Conservation and Irrigation Commission executives to stay whilst in Leeton, but was not licensed to sell alcohol until 1924 when the alcohol prohibition in the Murrumbidgee Irrigation Area was lifted.

During 1920 the Water Conservation and Irrigation Commission of New South Wales began to pressure the Government for relief for being responsible for providing civic and local government services with the Commission stating "revenue which comes mainly from rents and water charges, having remained unchanged, is insufficient to cover the cost of local government services now that the weekly wage is more than double the figure paid when the settlement started". The Commission chose and appointed an Advisory Board which was made up of pioneer farmers which already had been in operation in the Yanco area since 1913. In June 1925 the Commission released its annual report stating that a Royal Commission recommended setting up of local government bodies within the Murrumbidgee Irrigation Area but no date had been decided.

On 1 January 1928 the Willimbong Shire was formed with the name "Willimbong" being retained until 19 July 1946 when it was renamed as Leeton Shire.

In 1929 the Roxy Theatre was built on a large vacant block of land on the corner of Wade and Pine Avenue and was completed and opened in April 1930.

In 1930 Willimbong Shire become the trustee of the Leeton Racecourse, established in 1912, when the land was appropriated as a reserve for racing, public recreation and aviation. In August 1931 Southern Cross became the first aircraft to officially land at the aerodrome. During 1935, the aerodrome was refurbished to the standard that qualified it to base and fly commercial . In August 1935, Western and Southern Provincial (W.A.S.P.) Airlines commenced an air service between Leeton and Sydney. However the service was ended in 1936 when a Tugan Gannet aircraft used by W.A.S.P. Airlines crashed on 26 February 1936 in the Cordeaux Dam area.

In July 1938 it was proposed to the Willimbong Shire by the Civil Aviation Board that the area around Fivebough could be developed into an aerodrome since the Leeton Aerodrome at the race course was too small and could only operate on a restricted license. Willimbong Shire agreed to lease the land with preliminary work carried out on the site but the aerodrome was never used by any commercial airline.

During World War II, the Royal Australian Air Force established a training school in the nearby town of Narrandera which was a large aerodrome. After this, a report from the Department of Civil Aviation stated that Fivebough was eminently suitable as an aerodrome but strongly recommended that they should consider jointly operating the aerodrome with Narrandera Shire.

During the early part of the 1930s Willimbong Shire took over the town water supply when it became apparent that the town needed a second water tower which was completed next to the first tower on 27 March 1937.

The swimming baths in Leeton were constructed by voluntary labour and were completed on 24 February 1932. The Leeton Swimming Club made a request that the swimming baths be replaced by a modern swimming complex. In 1959 money was raised though the Irrigana Festival, a biennial festival in the town, and the Leeton Shire obtained a loan. On 17 November 1962 the Leeton & District Memorial Swimming Pool was opened.

Rice growing became a major industry during World War II under government promotion to help supply food for troops. A number of local farmers, such as teenager Norm Houghton, pioneered the planting of new varieties to suit the local conditions. The Irrigana Festival began in 1959 as a biennial event but was short lived due to a lack of strong publicity value. The name "Irrigana" was chosen from a competition in the Murrumbidgee Irrigator, In 1970 a similar festival returned in the town known as the "Rice Bowl Festival" and by 1988 the festival was renamed to "Sunwhite Rice Festival" with sponsorship from the Ricegrowers Co-Operative Limited.

Heritage listings
Leeton has a number of heritage-listed sites, including:
 Hydro Hotel
 Koonadan Historic Site
 Leeton District Lands Office
 Leeton District Office artefacts
 Leeton railway station
 Roxy Community Theatre

Education 

Leeton is the second largest educational centre in the Riverina after Wagga Wagga.

Leeton Shire has three secondary schools:
 Leeton High School
 St Francis de Sales Regional College
 Yanco Agricultural High School
Leeton Shire has six primary schools:
 Leeton Public School
 Parkview Public School
 St Joseph's Primary School
 Wamoon Public School
 Yanco Public School
 Whitton Public School
Other education includes:
 TAFE NSW Riverina Institute
 Murrumbidgee College of Agriculture
 Gralee Support School
 MET School (Leeton Campus)
 Leeton Pre-School
 Leeton Early Learning Centre
 Goodstart Early Learning

Climate 
Leeton has a semi-arid climate (BSk), with hot dry summers and cool winters. It features 137.7 clear days annually.

Transport

Leeton is approximately 450 km from Melbourne along the Newell, Goulburn Valley and Hume Highways and 550 km from Sydney along the Sturt and Hume Highways. There are daily flights leaving Narrandera Airport, operated by Regional Express. The airport is located near the shire boundary, approximately 20 km from the CBD. There are coach services to Sydney and Adelaide, leaving Leeton Coach Terminal in Gidgee Street daily. NSW TrainLink also operates coach services to Wagga Wagga connecting with XPT services to Sydney and Melbourne. An Xplorer service to Griffith calls at Leeton railway station on Wednesday and Saturday, with the return service to Sydney calling on Thursday and Sunday.

Industry 
The processing of agricultural products comprises Leeton's largest industry. Ricegrowers Limited, operating as SunRice and CopRice, is by far Leeton's largest employer. Its international headquarters are located in the town, as well a rice mill and manufacturing plants. Other major companies includes The Daily Juice Company, JSB Australia (as a subsidiary of JBS S.A.), Murrumbidgee Irrigation Limited, Pacific Fresh,Toorak Wines, Lillypilly Wines and Southern Central Engineering, as well as the Arnott's Group, located in Stanbridge and Southern Cotton, located in Whitton.

The Vance Industrial Estate houses many smaller scale industrial companies.

Attractions

Leeton has a number of town landmarks, including the Roxy Theatre, War Memorial, Madonna Place, St Peter's Church, and the historic Hydro Motor Inn which are located in the centre of town. The Burley Griffin water towers located on Chelmsford Place are an iconic feature of the town.

Outdoors
The Ramsar-listed Fivebough and Tuckerbil Wetlands as well as the nearby Murrumbidgee River and Murrumbidgee Valley National Park provide ample opportunities for bush-walking and birdwatching.

Food and wine
Restaurants and eateries available in Leeton include The Village Restaurant, Benvenuti Restaurant, Chan's Chinese Restaurant, Crate Cafe, The Coffee Tree, Mick's Bakehouse, Pages on Pine Restaurant and Grill, Leeton Soldiers Club, Henry's Chung Hing Chinese Restaurant, Hotel Leeton, L&D Bowling Club, Wade Hotel, and La Fresco Cafe.

Leeton is also home to two award-winning wineries, Lillipilly Estate Wines and Toorak Winery. Both wineries use locally grown grapes to create their wine, and each feature a cellar-door where customers can sample and purchase their products. Together, they offer a selection of red and white wines, as well as Botrytis dessert wines and fortified wines.

Retail

Leeton's main shopping areas include Pine Avenue and Kurrajong Avenue, as well as the town's two shopping complexes, Leeton Market Plaza (opened in 2006) and the Woolworths Complex on Wamoon Avenue. Other retailers include: Best & Less, Aldi, The Reject Shop, IGA, St. Vincent de Paul's and McDonald's. Target Country closed its Leeton branch in January 2021.

Media 
Leeton has its own newspaper known as The Irrigator (formerly known as The Murrumbidgee Irrigator) which is released throughout the region on Tuesday and Friday. Leeton also has influences on the Star FM (99.7) and 2RG radio stations which are based in Griffith. WIN Television also broadcasts the local news of the Riverina on weeknights.

Sport
The Leeton Greens play rugby league in the Group 20 Rugby League competition, and have won eight premierships. The club was founded in the 1920s, and play on Leeton No 1 Oval. They are the current reigning premiers as of 2022.

The Leeton-Whitton Crows play Australian rules football in the Riverina Football League, and were formed by a merger of the Leeton Redlegs and Whitton-Yanco Tigers in 1995. They won their first premiership since the merger in 2017, breaking a 39-year premiership drought.

Leeton United Football Club play soccer in the Griffith District Football Association, and were formed in 1962.

Notable citizens
Notable citizens originating from Leeton include former deputy leader of the Australian Labor Party and current federal MP for the NSW seat of Barton Linda Burney, Australian Labor Party Senator John Faulkner; Three time Olympic swimmer (Barcelona 1992, Atlanta 1996, Sydney 2000) and seven times Commonwealth Games gold medallist Matthew Dunn;
National Rugby League footballer Rod Maybon; professional road bicycle racer Robert McLachlan; National Rugby League footballer and commentator Peter Peters; former National Rugby League players Jay Bandy, Clint Halden, Rod Maybon, and Jeff Robson,; former captain of the Australia national cricket team, cricketer and commentator Mark Taylor; consumer advocate Helen Wellings; AFL players Craig Nettelbeck, Max Kruse, Jacob Hopper and Jacob Townsend.

Australian poet and writer Henry Lawson lived in Leeton for two years, from 1916 to 1917. Lawson had been hired to write about the Murrumbidgee Irrigation Area to attract settlers to the area.

References

External links

Leeton Shire Council – council website
Leeton Visitors Information Centre

 
Cities planned by Walter Burley Griffin
Planned cities in Australia
Towns in the Riverina
Towns in New South Wales